The Stende is a river in Latvia. It is 100 kilometres long.

See also
List of rivers of Latvia

Rivers of Latvia